Dame Henrietta Miriam Ottoline Leyser  (born 7 March 1965) is a British plant biologist and Regius Professor of Botany at the University of Cambridge, Chief Executive Officer of UK Research and Innovation (UKRI) and the Sainsbury Laboratory, Cambridge.

Education
Leyser was born in England. Her birth was registered in Ploughley, Oxfordshire She attended Wychwood School in Oxford and the University of Cambridge as an undergraduate student of Newnham College, Cambridge, where she received her Bachelor of Arts degree in Natural Sciences in 1986 followed by a PhD in Genetics in 1990 for research supervised by Ian Furner.

Research and career
Her postdoctoral research at Indiana University preceded a lectureship at the University of York, where Leyser worked from 1994 - 2010.  In 2010, Leyser was appointed Director of the Sainsbury Laboratory and Professor of Plant Development at the University of Cambridge.  
Leyser's research interests are in the genetics of plant development and the interaction of plant hormones with the environment. Leyser is chair of the University of Cambridge Centre for Science and Policy Management Committee. In 2020 she was appointed the Chief Executive of UK Research and Innovation.

Awards and honours
Leyser was elected a Fellow of the Royal Society (FRS) in 2007. Her nomination reads: 

Leyser was appointed Commander of the Order of the British Empire (CBE) in the 2009 New Year Honours. She was a member of the Nuffield Council on Bioethics from 2009 to 2015, and a member of the Council’s Working Party on Biofuels (2009-2011).

Leyser was elected a foreign associate of the US National Academy of Sciences in 2012. She has been a Member of the German Academy of Sciences Leopoldina since 2014. In 2016, she was awarded an honorary doctorate by the Norwegian University of Science and Technology (NTNU). Other honours include the Society of Experimental Biology’s President’s Medal (2000), the Royal Society's Rosalind Franklin Award (2007), the International Plant Growth Substance Association’s Silver Medal (2010), the UK Genetic Society Medal (2016, which recognises outstanding contributions to genetics research), and the EMBO Women in Science Award (2017).

Leyser was appointed Dame Commander of the Order of the British Empire (DBE) in the 2017 New Year Honours for services to plant science, science in society, and equality and diversity in science. That same year, she received the Women in Science Award from the European Molecular Biology Organization (EMBO) and the Federation of European Biochemical Societies (FEBS).

Personal life
Leyser is the daughter of the historians Henrietta Leyser and Karl Leyser. She married Stephen John Day in 1986 and has one son and one daughter. She has been a guest of Jim Al-Khalili on the BBC Radio 4 programme The Life Scientific multiple times.

References

1965 births
Living people
British botanists
Women botanists
Female Fellows of the Royal Society
Members of the European Molecular Biology Organization
Academics of the University of York
Dames Commander of the Order of the British Empire
Foreign associates of the National Academy of Sciences
British women scientists
Alumni of Newnham College, Cambridge
Fellows of Clare College, Cambridge
Members of the German Academy of Sciences Leopoldina
British people of German descent
Regius Professors of Botany (Cambridge)